Torenia is a genus of plants now classified in the family Linderniaceae. Torenia has also been classified in the figwort family Scrophulariaceae. Often called wishbone flowers, bluewings; in Hawaii nanioola'a or ola'a beauty, some species are grown as garden plants. Many F1 and F2 Torenia hybrids have been hybridized in the last 30 years. Colors can range from white with yellow throats to violet, blue, cobalt, lavender and purple.

Species
The following species are recognised in the genus Torenia:
 
Torenia anagallis 
Torenia asiatica 
Torenia benthamiana 
Torenia bicolor 
Torenia bimaculata 
Torenia biniflora 
Torenia blancoi 
Torenia burttiana 
Torenia caelestis 
Torenia cambodgiana 
Torenia celebica 
Torenia chevalieri 
Torenia ciliaris 
Torenia concolor 
Torenia cordata 
Torenia cordifolia 
Torenia courtallensis 
Torenia crenata 
Torenia crustacea 
Torenia cyanea 
Torenia cyrtandriflora 
Torenia daubyi 
Torenia davidii 
Torenia dictyophora 
Torenia diffusa 
Torenia dinklagei 
Torenia flava 
Torenia fordii 
Torenia fournieri 
Torenia godefroyi 
Torenia grandiflora 
Torenia hayatae 
Torenia hirsulissima 
Torenia hirsuta 
Torenia indica 
Torenia javanica 
Torenia kinmenensis 
Torenia laotica 
Torenia leucosiphon 
Torenia lindernioides 
Torenia maculata 
Torenia mannii 
Torenia molluginoides 
Torenia oblonga 
Torenia patens 
Torenia perennans 
Torenia philcoxii 
Torenia pierreana 
Torenia pierreanoides 
Torenia poilanei 
Torenia polygonoides 
Torenia pterogona 
Torenia ranongensis 
Torenia scandens 
Torenia siamensis 
Torenia silvicola 
Torenia spathacea 
Torenia stolonifera 
Torenia subconnivens 
Torenia taishanensis 
Torenia thailandica 
Torenia thorelii 
Torenia thouarsii 
Torenia travancorica 
Torenia udawnensis 
Torenia umbellata 
Torenia vientianica 
Torenia violacea

References

Lamiales genera
Linderniaceae